Sugar Boy and the Sinners is a Dutch band from South Holland. The band is formed by brothers Vinnie and Ronnie Guerin in 2010, together with Boy Vielvoye and the Frankie Duindam. In their early years, the band focused mainly on blues, but more recently the band is inspired by old school soul, rock and roll and funk.

Biography 

After making a name for themselves in the local blues circuit, Sugar Boy and the Sinners acquired nationwide attention by playing famous festivals such as Moulin Blues and Breda Jazz.

Another important stepping stone was the band’s victory at the Dutch Blues Challenge 2012. As a result, Sugar Boy and the Sinners represented the Netherlands at the European Blues Challenge in Toulouse (3rd place out of 19) and the International Blues Challenge in Memphis, United States (making it to the semi-finals).

Currently the band is touring throughout Europe in countries such as Belgium, Germany, France and Italy. Their debut album was released at the Paradiso in Amsterdam on 7 February 2014.

Discography

Albums

Singles

References

External links 
 Official website
 Facebook page

Dutch blues musical groups